Guanrong Chen or Ron Chen is a Chinese mathematician who made contributions to Chaos theory. He has been the chair professor and the founding director of the Centre for Chaos and Complex Networks at the City University of Hong Kong since 2000. Prior to that, he was a tenured full professor at the University of Houston, Texas. Chen was elected Member of the Academy of Europe in 2014, elected Fellow of The World Academy of Sciences in 2015, and elected IEEE Fellow in 1997. He is currently the editor-in-chief for the International Journal of Bifurcation and Chaos.

He is known for his contributions to Chaos theory and Bifurcation theory, including the Chen attractor, a kind of dynamical system attractor named after him (see Multiscroll attractor).

Early life 
In 1948, Chen Guanrong was born in Guangzhou, China. In 1978, he enrolled in the Guangzhou Sun Yat-sen University. In 1981 he graduated with a master's degree in computational mathematics.

He then studied in the US and in 1987 earned a PhD in applied math from Texas A&M University.

Academia 
From 1987 to 1990 he worked as a professor at Rice University. From 1990 to 1999 he worked at University of Houston and became a full tenured professor.

In 2000, he became a chair professor at the City University of Hong Kong, founding the Centre for Chaos and Complex Networks.

He conducts research on chaos, control theory, bifurcations, nonlinear dynamics, complex systems, etc.

IEEE 
From 1999 to 2001, he served as the chairman for the IEEE Nonlinear Circuits and Systems Technical Committee. Since 2008, he has served as Editor in Chief of IEEE Circuits and Systems Magazine.

Since 2010, he has served as Editor in Chief of International Journal of Bifurcation and Chaos. Before, from 1991 to 2009, he was editor for the International Journal of Bifurcation and Chaos. From 2004 to 2007, he was Deputy Editor-in-Chief for the IEEE Transactions on Circuits and Systems. From 2004 to 2005, he was an editor for the IEEE Transactions on Automatic Control.

Journals and conferences 
From 2008 to 2009, he was Deputy Editor-in-Chief for the International Journal of Circuits Theory and Applications as well as editor for the International Journal of Circuits Theory and Applications.

From 2006 to 2008, he was editor for the Journal of Control Science and Engineering.

Since 1995, he has been editor for the Chinese Academy of Sciences Journal on Control Theory and Applications.

From 2001 to 2014, he was editor for the Journal of Systems Science and Complexity.

From 2009 to 2014, he served as the chairman for the Chinese Society's Complex Systems and Networks Committee.

Research 
He is known for the Chen attractor, Lu Chen attractor, and other works on Multiscroll attractors. He conducts research on chaos, control theory, bifurcations, nonlinear dynamics, complex systems, etc.

Chen attractor 

Chen discovered the Chen equations, a system of coupled differential equations that produce the Chen's attractor, a type of Lorenz attractor.

The equations that govern the Chen system are:
 

 

 
where .

Publications 
Chen Guanrong has published over 650 papers and over 300 abstracts on chaos theory and related fields. He currently has over 60,000 citations, making him one of the most cited leaders in the field.

 Chen G., Ueta T. Yet another chaotic attractor. Journal of Bifurcation and Chaos, 1999 9:1465.
 Chen, Guanrong; Jinhu Lu (2006). "GENERATING MULTISCROLL CHAOTIC ATTRACTORS: THEORIES, METHODS AND APPLICATIONS" (PDF). International Journal of Bifurcation and Chaos.
Fangyue Chen, Guolong He, Xiubin Xu, and Guanrong Chen, "Implementation of Arbitrary Boolean Functions via CNN" (a paper on Cellular neural networks).
Books

 Kalman Filtering with Real-Time Applications
 Linear Systems and Optimal Control
 Hopf Bifurcation Analysis: A Frequency Domain Approach
 From Chaos to Order: Methodologies, Perspectives and Applications
Dynamics of the Lorenz System Family: Analysis, Control and Synchronization
Complex Networks: Models, Dynamics and Control
Integration of Fuzzy Logic and Chaos Theory
Evolutionary Algorithms and Chaotic Systems

Awards and honors 

 IEEE Fellow (1997)
Honorary Doctorate of University of Le Havre, Normandy, France (2014)
Honorary Doctorate (Doctoris Honoris Causa) of Saint Petersburg State University, Russia (2011)
 Euler Gold Medal (2011)
 SCI Highly Cited Researcher in Engineering, Thomson Reuters (since November 2009)
Harden-Simons Annual Prize for Outstanding Journal Paper, American Society of Engineering Education (1998)
Best Paper Award (2002), Institute of Information Theory and Automation, Academy of Sciences of the Czech Republic
IEEE M. Barry Carlton Best Annual Paper Award, IEEE Aerospace and Electronic Systems Society (2001)
IEEE Guillemin-Cauer Best Annual Paper Award, IEEE Circuits and Systems Society (2005)
IET Premium Best Paper Award (2013)
State Natural Science Award, China (2008, 2012, 2016)
President's Award of City University of Hong Kong (2019)
Ho-Leung-Ho-Lee Science and Technology Award (2010)
Junior Faculty Research Excellence Award, University of Houston (1993)

Honorary professorships 
Chen Guanrong has given lectures in more than 30 countries and holds honorary professor positions in many universities around the world, including but not limited to:

 Central Queensland University, Australia;
 University of Ballarat, Australia;
 Universidad Nacional del Sur, Argentina;
 Chang-Jiang Chair Professor of Peking University;
 Fudan University;
 Tsinghua University;
 University of Science and Technology of China;
 Shanghai Jiao Tong University;
 Sun Yat-sen University;
 Tianjin University;
 Zhejiang University

See also 

 Multiscroll attractor

References

Living people
Academic staff of the City University of Hong Kong
Educators from Guangdong
Writers from Guangzhou
Academic staff of Peking University
Fellow Members of the IEEE
Members of Academia Europaea
Chinese science writers
1948 births
Chaos theorists
Rice University faculty
Sun Yat-sen University alumni